Heart Beats is the debut studio album by Danny Saucedo, released in 2007 following his participation in Idol 2006. The album debuted and peaked at number one on the Swedish Albums Chart. Three singles were released from the album, all of which peaked within the top 3.

Track listing

Charts

Weekly charts

Year-end charts

References 

2007 albums
Albums produced by Twin
Danny Saucedo albums